The SNCASO S.O.7050, S.O.7055, S.O.7056 and S.O.7060 Deauville were single-engine light French civil utility aircraft of the 1940s. Only two airframes were built but were modified with different undercarriages, engines and seating.

Development

In 1947 SNCASO built two similar light aircraft both carrying the name Deauville. The first, the S.O.7050 which flew on 11 June had a tricycle undercarriage.  The second, the S.O.7055 flew on 1 July with a tailwheel undercarriage. The first and possibly the second machine was powered by a  Mathis 4GO flat-four engine, though the S.O.7055 had a  Minié 4.DC.32 flat-four at some point. It was later modified into the SO.7056. In 1948 both airframes were re-engined with  Walter Minor 4-III engines and a third seat was added behind the two front side-by-side seats to produce the S.O.7060 Deauville. The undercarriage of the S.O.7050 was modified to be like that of the SO.7056, so both S.O.7060s had tailwheel gear.

The Deauvilles were of all-metal construction with low/mid set wings of constant chord, straight tapered tail surfaces and a fixed tailwheel undercarriage. The canopy was entirely transparent and slid back to permit the access of pilot and passengers. Dual controls were provided.

Operational history

The first airframe  F-BDVZ was flown by its makers in S.O.7060 form for several years and then by an aero club based at St-Cyr-l'Ecole airfield to the west of Paris during the later 1950s and through the 1960s. The aircraft remained on the French civil aircraft register in May 1967, but was no longer registered in 1973 and it has not survived in preservation.

Variants
S.O.7050 Deauville The first aircraft in its original form, with the Mathis engine and tricycle gear, first flown 11 June 1947.

S.O.7055 Deauville The second, with conventional gear and at least part of the time with the Minié 4Dc-32 engine instead of the Mathis. First flown on 1 July 1947.
S.O.7056 Deauville The S.O.7055 modified.

S.O.7060 Deauville The S.O.7050 and the S.O.7056 re-engined with Walter Minor 4-III engines, both with tailwheel undercarriages, and with  a third seat behind the side by side front seats. First flown on 22 March 1948.

Specifications (S.O.7060)

References

Notes

Bibliography

1940s French civil utility aircraft
Deauville
Low-wing aircraft
Single-engined tractor aircraft
Aircraft first flown in 1948